Paula Barker (born 9 May 1972) is a British politician who has served as Member of Parliament (MP) for Liverpool Wavertree since 2019. A member of the Labour Party, she has served as the Shadow Minister for Homelessness and Rough Sleeping since October 2022.

Before her election, Barker was the Unison North West Regional Convenor, as well as the leader of her local government branch in Halton, Cheshire.

Early life and education
Barker was born at Sefton General Hospital in Wavertree, Liverpool. Her father was diagnosed with cancer and died two weeks before her second birthday, leaving her mother to raise her as a single parent. Barker attended Holly Lodge Girls' High School in West Derby, Liverpool.

Early career
Barker was employed in local government for almost 30 years. On day one of her employment, she went to find the union rep and joined NALGO. Within the first year of her employment, she was balloted for industrial action and joined colleagues on the picket line.

She eventually moved from Liverpool City Council for a promotion at neighbouring Knowsley Council to work in Customer Services, where she spent around four years. In around 2001, she joined Halton Borough Council, where she progressively became more active in her trade union, UNISON. She held a variety of roles in her local branch, before becoming Branch Secretary and then for the last five years prior to her election to Parliament, she was the North West Regional Convenor for UNISON, the most senior lay official for the union. In this role, she constantly championed workers rights for the 200,000 plus members she represented.

Political career
Barker's candidacy to be the Labour candidate for Liverpool Wavertree was backed by several unions and Momentum. She was subsequently elected at the 2019 general election, winning 31,310 votes (72.2% of the vote) a fall of 3,407 votes (7.3%).

Barker made her maiden speech on 4 February 2020, becoming one of the first of the new MPs from the 2019 general election to do so. In it, she outlined the rich diversity of the Liverpool Wavertree constituency, whilst also pointing out to the Secretary of State for Housing, Communities and Local Government that it is local representatives who know what is best for their constituencies.

Since that maiden speech, Barker has called upon the Government to enact meaningful reform of the social care market. She also sponsored the Private Members Bill put forward by Mike Amesbury, Labour MP for Weaver Vale, on proposed changes to the law regarding school uniforms.

Barker served as a member of the Justice Select Committee between May 2020 and July 2021 and is currently a Member of Home Affairs Select Committee and became PPS to Shadow Defence Minister, John Healey in March 2022. She was appointed Shadow Minister for Homelessness and Rough Sleeping on 28 October 2022.

Notes

References

External links

1972 births
Living people
Politicians from Liverpool
21st-century British women politicians
Councillors in Liverpool
Female members of the Parliament of the United Kingdom for English constituencies
Labour Party (UK) MPs for English constituencies
Members of the Parliament of the United Kingdom for Liverpool constituencies
UK MPs 2019–present
21st-century English women
21st-century English people
Women councillors in England